Dillwynia cinerascens, commonly known as grey parrot-pea, is a species of flowering plant in the family Fabaceae and is endemic to south-eastern Australia. It is an erect to low-lying shrub with linear or thread-like leaves and orange or yellow flowers.

Description
The flowers are mostly orange or yellow and arranged in short racemes or corymbs, usually on the ends of branchlets, each flower sessile or on a short peduncle.

Taxonomy
Dillwynia cinerascens was first formally described by botanist Robert Brown in  the Botanical Magazine in 1821. Brown came across the plant in 1804 growing near the River Derwent in Tasmania. The specific epithet (cinerascens) means "becoming ash-grey".

Distribution
Grey parrot-pea grows in dry forest and woodland and is widespread in Victoria but also occurring in New South Wales south from near Bathurst, in Tasmania and in the far south-east of South Australia.

References 

cinerascens
Fabales of Australia
Flora of New South Wales
Flora of South Australia
Flora of Tasmania
Flora of Victoria (Australia)